Ottavio Serena (18 August 1837 – 7 January 1914) was an Italian politician, judge, prefect and historian. He is  known in his hometown Altamura for his works about local history, such as the Altamuran Revolution (1799). His contribution and the testimonies he collected allowed to shed light on some historical events (such as the killing of Giovanni Firrao (1799) and on legendary toponyms (Petilia and Altilia).

Moreover, he was one of the promoters of the construction of Acquedotto pugliese ("Apulia waterworks"), which he considered essential for the development of Italian region Apulia.

Life 
Ottavio Serena was born in Altamura on 18 August 1837 from a noble local family. The Serena family is supposed to have originated from Monte Sant'Angelo, but they later moved to Foggia. The family owned the fiefdom of Lapigio as early as 1407 with full control over the vassals and with full jurisdiction, as shown on a diploma by queen Joanna II of Naples.

Ottavio Serena graduated in law as well as in literature and philosophy; at the beginning of his career he took care of the reorganization of the education of the Kingdom of the Two Sicilies at the request of Saverio Baldacchini.

During the Risorgimento he was a revolutionary, but, having dedicated his life to research and study, he never fought, unlike many of his friends. Nevertheless, he was no less in the struggle, conspiring under the watchful and suspicious eye of the Bourbon police and he was also member of temporary government established in Altamura, while within walking distance of the city there was a large contingent of the Bourbon army led by general Flores.

After the Unification of Italy (1861), he was relocated to Turin, where he worked as secretary of Italian minister Francesco De Sanctis. He began more and more interested in politics, and, in 1870 he was elected provincial councilor of Bari. In 1874, he was elected as member of the Parliament of the Kingdom of Italy.

In 1888, he was appointed prefect of Pavia, while in 1889 he became prefect of Lecce. In 1898, he was elected Senator of the Kingdom of Italy. In his life, he was also appointed judge, President of Council of State, and he was also mayor of his hometown Altamura (1871-1875). He was elected seven times either in the Chamber of Deputies or in the Italian Senate. After a long life devoted both to politics and the history of his hometown Altamura, Serena died on 7 January 1914 after three years of suffering caused by a disease.

Works

See also 
 Altamura
 Kingdom of Italy

References

Sources

External links 

1837 births
1914 deaths
19th-century Italian historians
20th-century Italian judges
Italian prefects
Mayors of places in Apulia
Members of the Senate of the Kingdom of Italy
Members of the Chamber of Deputies (Kingdom of Italy)